The  Madras Synagogue  is the only synagogue in Madras and it was built by Jacques (Jaime) de Paiva (Pavia) a Paradesi Jew of Madras. Madras Synagogue was also known as the Esnoga, or  Snoge, Esnoga is synagogue in Ladino, the traditional Judaeo-Spanish language of Sephardic Jews.

The Amsterdam Sephardic community was among the richest Jewish communities in Europe during the Dutch Golden Age. They came to Madras for trading in Golconda diamonds, precious stones and corals, they developed very good relations with the rulers of Golkonda and maintained trade connections to Europe.

Stone inscription of the oldest synagogue in Tamil Nadu has been discovered near Valantharai near Ramanathapuram This inscription dates back to the 13th century CE.

History

1600s The first Madras Synagogues and Cemeteries was built by Amsterdam Sephardic community in Coral Merchant Street, George Town, Madras, which had a large presence of Portuguese Jews in the seventeenth and eighteenth centuries. Neither the synagogue nor the Jewish population remains today.

1644 The Second Madras Synagogue and Jewish Cemetery Chennai was built by Jacques (Jaime) de Paiva (Pavia) also from Amsterdam Sephardic community, in Peddanaickenpet, which later became the South end of Mint Street,

1934 The Second Madras Synagogue and Jewish Cemetery Chennai was partly demolished by the local government and the tombstones were moved to the Central Park of Madras along with the gate of the cemetery on which Beit ha-Haim (the usual designation for a Jewish cemetery, literally "House of Life") were written in Hebrew. 

5 June 1968 Local government fully demolished the remaining Madras Synagogue and Jewish Cemetery Chennai and took over the land for building a government school, hence Rabbi Levi Salomon (Last rabbi of madras synagogue) died of Heart attack. The remaining tombstones were moved opposite Kasimedu cemetery.

1983, The tombstones from Central Park of Madras and opposite Kasimedu cemetery were moved to Lloyds Road, when the Chennai Harbour expansion project was approved. In this whole process 17 tombstones went missing, including that of Jacques (Jaime) de Paiva (Pavia).

Present
After ISIS planned attack, Madras Synagogue is at undisclosed location under custody of Isaac and Rosa Charitable Trust, Henriques De Castro family. 

Henriques De Castro family has decided to handover everything to Archaeological Survey of India

Objects of antiquity
Madras Synagogue has eight Scrolls of the Law, several gold, silver and brass Antique Judaica Items. 

Henriques De Castro family has decided to handover everything to Archaeological Survey of India

Image gallery

References

Notes

Citations

External links 
 The Jews of Chennai

1568 establishments in India
16th-century synagogues
Orthodox Judaism in India
Orthodox synagogues
Paradesi Jews
Sephardi Jewish culture in India
Sephardi synagogues
Synagogues in Kerala